Roderick Hietbrink (born 15 June 1975) is a contemporary Dutch visual artist, living and working between Oslo, Norway and Amsterdam, Netherlands. His practice encompasses video art, installation art, performance art, sculpture and photography.

Roderick Hietbrink studied visual arts at the Academy of Art and Design St. Joost in Breda (1995–1999), the Piet Zwart Institute in Rotterdam (2001–2002) and the Rijksakademie van beeldende kunsten in Amsterdam (2011–2012).

Work 

Through the use of different media Hietbrink questions and explores different aspects of the psychological and inherent conflicts between the rational and instinctive self. He juxtaposes the everyday with the surreal, and the cultivated with the instinctive, in order to address and blur the divisions between these traditionally binary fields in spatial installations and live performances that can be endearing and humorous, while at the same time painful and sad.

Selected group and solo exhibitions 

2018

 33rd Bienal de São Paulo 
 Into Nature, Netherlands 

2017

 Kunsthall Oslo 

2015

 P/////AKT, Amsterdam 
 LIAF Biennale, Lofoten Norway 
 Unge Kunsteres Samfund (UKS), Oslo 

2013

 Stedelijk Museum Amsterdam (collection presentation)
 5th Moscow Biennale (Special programme) 
 De Appel Amsterdam

References

External links 
 Official website of Roderick Hietbrink
 Rijksakademie van beeldende kunsten
 Roderick Hietbrink on Vimeo

1975 births
Living people
Dutch artists
Artists from Amsterdam